Keith Edward Brown (born February 14, 1964) is a retired Major League Baseball (MLB) pitcher. He played during four seasons in MLB for the Cincinnati Reds. He was drafted by the Reds in the 21st round of the 1986 amateur draft. Brown played his first professional season with their Rookie league teams (the Gulf Coast Reds and Billings Mustangs) and their Double-A Vermont Reds in 1986. He played his final season with the Florida Marlins' Triple-A affiliate, the Charlotte Knights, in 1995.

External links

1964 births
Living people
Baseball players from Arizona
Major League Baseball pitchers
Cincinnati Reds players
Billings Mustangs players
Cedar Rapids Reds players
Charlotte Knights players
Chattanooga Lookouts players
Gulf Coast Reds players
Nashville Sounds players
Omaha Royals players
Sacramento State Hornets baseball players
Vermont Reds players
People from Flagstaff, Arizona